Lorentz Diderich Klüwer (23 December 1790 – 4 January 1825) was a Norwegian officer, cartographer and antiquarian. 

Klüwer was born at Verdal in Nord-Trøndelag, Norway. He was the son of  Wilhelm Klüwer (1759–1816) and Sophie Hersleb Krog (1771–1848).
From 1804–08, he attended the Norwegian Military Academy in Christiania (now Oslo). Klüwer entered the Royal Norwegian Army becoming a  Captain in 1815 and Major in 1823.  From 1811, Klüwer was a member of the Royal Norwegian Society of Sciences and Letters.

From 1810 until 1814, he worked to make military maps of northern Norway from Femunden to Snåsa. His work included surveys, historical maps and a registry of cultural monuments.  His Kart over Norges militaire Inddeling was published in 1821. Klüwer's main work, Norske Mindesmerker, was published in 1823.

References

1790 births
1825 deaths
People from Nord-Trøndelag
Norwegian Army personnel
Norwegian military personnel of the Napoleonic Wars
19th-century Norwegian historians
Members of the Norwegian Academy of Science and Letters